Prospective refers to an event that is likely or expected to happen in the future.  For example, a prospective student is someone who is considering attending a school. A prospective cohort study is a type of study, e.g., in sociology or medicine, that follows participants for a particular future time period.

It may also refer to the following:

 Prospective aspect, a grammatical aspect
 Prospective Dolly (born 1987), Thoroughbred racehorse
 Prospective memory, remembering to perform an intended action
 Prospective parliamentary candidate, a term used in British politics
 Prospective Piloted Transport System, a project to develop a new-generation crewed spacecraft
 Prospective search, a method of searching on the Internet
 Prospective short-circuit current, the highest electric current which can exist in a particular electrical system under short circuit conditions
 Prospective payment system, a payment model used in health care to control costs

See also 
 Retrospective generally means to study events that already have taken place.